The 2002–03 AHL season was the 67th season of the American Hockey League. Twenty-eight teams played 80 games each in the schedule. The Hamilton Bulldogs finished first overall in the regular season. The Houston Aeros won their first Calder Cup championship.

Team changes
 The Quebec Citadelles move to Hamilton, Ontario, merging with the Hamilton Bulldogs, operating with as a joint affiliate for the Edmonton Oilers and Montreal Canadiens.
 The dormant Prince Edward Island Senators resume operations as the Binghamton Senators, based in Binghamton, New York, playing in the east division.
 The Springfield Falcons switch divisions from North to East.
 The Providence Bruins switch divisions from East to North.
 The Grand Rapids Griffins switch divisions from West to Central.
 The San Antonio Rampage join the AHL as an expansion team, based in San Antonio, Texas, playing in the west division.

Final standings
Note: GP = Games played; W = Wins; L = Losses; T = Ties; OTL = Overtime losses; GF = Goals for; GA = Goals against; Pts = Points;

Eastern Conference

Western Conference

Scoring leaders

Note: GP = Games played; G = Goals; A = Assists; Pts = Points; PIM = Penalty minutes

 complete list

Calder Cup playoffs

All Star Classic
The 16th AHL All-Star Game was played on February 3, 2003 at the Cumberland County Civic Center in Portland, Maine. Team Canada defeated Team PlanetUSA 10-7. In the skills competition held the day before the All-Star Game, Team Canada won 15-13 over Team PlanetUSA.

Trophy and award winners

Team awards

Individual awards

Other awards

See also
List of AHL seasons

References
AHL official site
AHL Hall of Fame
HockeyDB

 
American Hockey League seasons
2
2